The 2020–21 Atlantic Hockey men's ice hockey season was the 18th season of play for Atlantic Hockey and took place during the 2020–21 NCAA Division I men's ice hockey season. The start of the regular season was delayed until November 19, 2020 and concluded on February 27, 2021.

Season

COVID-19
The entire Atlantic Hockey season was held under the cloud of the COVID-19 pandemic. The season's start was delayed for more than a month while university and health officials could decide on a safe way to play games. In the end, the conference was divided into two regions, East and West, with the two groups of teams only playing one another. This was done to reduce the amount of travel and exposure that the players and staff members would experience throughout the season. As a result of this arrangement, the conference standings would not be altered, however, tournament seeding would continue with east and west teams until the semifinal round.

Non-Conference
Unlike other seasons, the 20-21 season would see only a small number of non-conference games being played. This, like many other alterations, was due to COVID-19. This would cause the Pairwise Rankings, which were normally used to determine the at-large bids for the NCAA tournament, to be rendered useless. However, due to the perception of Atlantic Hockey as the weakest of the six Division I conferences, only the eventual tournament champion would go on to make the national tournament.

Standings

Coaches

Records

Statistics

Leading scorers
GP = Games played; G = Goals; A = Assists; Pts = Points; PIM = Penalty minutes

Leading goaltenders
Minimum 1/3 of team's minutes played in conference games.

GP = Games played; Min = Minutes played; GA = Goals against; SO = Shutouts; SV% = Save percentage; GAA = Goals against average

Conference tournament

NCAA tournament

Midwest Regional semifinal

Ranking

USCHO

USCHO did not release a poll in week 20.

USA Today

Awards

NCAA

Conference

East Pod

West Pod

Conference tournament

References

External links

2020–21 Atlantic Hockey men's ice hockey season
Atlantic Hockey
2020–21